Jeff Staples (born March 4, 1975) is a Canadian former professional ice hockey player who played in the American Hockey League (AHL) and International Hockey League (IHL). He was drafted by the Philadelphia Flyers in the tenth round of the 1993 NHL Entry Draft. After completing his junior hockey career with the Brandon Wheat Kings, Staples played three seasons with the Flyers' top minor league affiliate, the first season with the Hershey Bears and two seasons with the Philadelphia Phantoms. After winning the Calder Cup with the Phantoms in 1998, Staples was traded to the expansion Nashville Predators along with Dominic Roussel for a 7th-round pick in the 1998 NHL Entry Draft. After one season playing in the IHL for the Milwaukee Admirals, Staples played one more AHL season with the Saint John Flames before retiring.

Career statistics

References

External links

1975 births
Brandon Wheat Kings players
Canadian ice hockey defencemen
Hershey Bears players
Ice hockey people from British Columbia
Living people
Milwaukee Admirals (IHL) players
Philadelphia Flyers draft picks
Philadelphia Phantoms players
Portage Terriers players
Saint John Flames players